This is a list of casual vacancies in the Australian Capital Territory Legislative Assembly, caused by the resignation or death of an incumbent member. A departure creates a casual vacancy which is filled by a countback of the votes for the departing member at the previous election. Prior to the introduction of the Hare-Clark electoral system in 1995, casual vacancies were instead filled by appointment by the party of the departing member.

List of countbacks (1995-present)

List of appointments (1989-1995)

References

Legislative Assembly casual vacancies